Bactrocera fulvoabdominalis is a species of tephritid or fruit flies in the genus Bactrocera of the family Tephritidae.

References

Dacinae